Gunah Aur Kanoon is a 1970 Indian Hindi language crime drama film directed by B. R. Ishara. The film stars Sanjeev Kumar and Prithviraj Kapoor.

Cast
Prithviraj Kapoor as Jamnadas
Sanjeev Kumar as Rakesh 
Kumkum as Poonam
Sailesh Kumar as Shailesh
Tarun Bose   
Mohan Choti   
P. Jairaj   
Mohan Sherry

Soundtrack

References

External links
 

1970 films
1970s Hindi-language films
1970 drama films
Films scored by Sapan-Jagmohan
Films directed by B. R. Ishara
Indian crime drama films
Indian black-and-white films